Bar II is the second local season of the reality The Bar in Poland.

Synopsis
Start Date: 14 September 2002.
End Date: 13 December 2002.
Duration: 91 days.
Contestants:
The Finalists: Eric (The Winner) & Dobrosława (Runner-up).
Evicted Contestants: Adam, Adrian, Arkadiusz, Daniel, Daria, Dorota, Julita, Marcin, Marta B, Marta R, Narine, Paweł, Roksana, Tomasz K & Tomasz Z.
Voluntary Exits: Ewelina.

Contestants

Nominations

References

2002 Polish television seasons